Nick or Nicholas Beal(e) may refer to:

Nick Beal (born 1970), English rugby player
Nick Beal, main character in film Alias Nick Beal
Nicholas Beale, co-author of the book Questions of Truth